Pramocaine (INN and BAN, also known as pramoxine or pramoxine HCI) is a topical anesthetic discovered at Abbott Laboratories in 1953 and used as an antipruritic. During research and development, pramocaine hydrochloride stood out among a series of alkoxy aryl alkamine ethers as an especially good topical local anesthetic agent. Pharmacologic study revealed it to be potent and of low acute and subacute toxicity, well tolerated by most mucous membranes and of a low sensitizing index in humans. Like other local anesthetics, pramocaine decreases the permeability of neuronal membranes to sodium ions, blocking both initiation and conduction of nerve impulses. Depolarization and repolarization of excitable neural membranes is thus inhibited, leading to numbness.

Use 

Topical anesthetics are used to relieve pain and itching caused by conditions such as sunburn or other minor burns, insect bites or stings, poison ivy, poison oak, poison sumac, and minor cuts and scratches. The popular itch creams Gold Bond and some forms of calamine lotion use pramocaine hydrochloride to numb sensitive skin, as does the pain relief variant of Neosporin and some formulations of Sarna. The hydrochloride salt form of pramocaine is water-soluble.

Pramocaine is a common component of over the counter hemorrhoid preparations.

Synthesis

The ether formation between hydroquinone (1) and 1-bromobutane (2) gives 4-butoxyphenol [122-94-1] (3). Alkylation with 3-chloropropoylmorpholine [57616-74-7] (4) gives pramocaine (5).

See also 
 Local anesthesia

References 

Local anesthetics
4-Morpholinyl compunds
Phenol ethers